Cass Browne (born 27 September 1971 in Wimbledon, Surrey) is an English musician and writer.

He was a member of the band The Psychotics who became Senseless Things in 1986. Senseless Things made four studio albums, achieved two UK Top 20 hits and released many other singles in their nine years together, before splitting up in 1995. Jamie Hewlett was a big fan of the band and designed many of their sleeves. Senseless Things were known for their relentless touring schedule which saw them perform across the UK, as well as Europe, Japan and the United States.

When the Senseless Things split up, Browne formed a new band Delakota, which he toured with for a couple of years. Delakota made their first live appearance on Newsnight and released the album One Love in 1998, tracks from which received remixes from Fatboy Slim, David Holmes, the pre-UNKLE producer Tim Goldsworthy, Royal Trux, the artist Four Tet (under his "Joshua Falken" moniker), Freddy Fresh and others. In 2022 the album saw a Deluxe Digital Edition release, alongside the original remixes and B-Sides. A visual was released for the Fatboy Slim remix of the single "C'mon Cincinnati" in September of 2022, which was assembled from recovered footage of the first Delakota concert in 1998, performed "200ft underground" at the Hellfire Caves in High Wycombe. 

Cass performed with Urge Overkill for the promotion of the band’s single "Girl, You’ll Be a Woman Soon" taken from the soundtrack of the Quentin Tarantino film "Pulp Fiction". Cass Browne also worked with Damon Albarn as his drummer on 2002's Mali Music

Browne was an important member of the Gorillaz family from his addition in 2001, until his departure in 2012. From 2001 to 2010, he provided drums and drum machines on Gorillaz’ Gorillaz (album) and Demon Days. He performed at all dates on Gorillaz live shows and appears on Demon Days Live behind the drums at the Manchester Opera House.

Cass performed on the 2010 The Escape to Plastic Beach Tour debuting at The Coachella Valley Music and Arts Festival in Palm Springs, on 18 April 2010. The live band were now joined by additional musicians such as Lou Reed, Snoop Dogg, Bobby Womack, Neneh Cherry, Mark E. Smith, Hypnotic Brass Ensemble, De La Soul, Mos Def, Bootie Brown, Little Dragon, Shaun Ryder, Bashy and Kano, Gruff Rhys of Super Furry Animals, The Syrian National Orchestra for Arabic Music and more. Performances were the undertaken throughout the year with a headlining spot at 2010’s Glastonbury Festival. The world tour would take in appearances across Europe, the U.S., China, Australia and New Zealand, with additional headline concerts at the Roskilde and Benicassim festivals. 

Cass Browne was the author of all the dialogue of the band members, penning the autobiography Rise of the Ogre in 2006 and writing dialogue such as MEL's website tour in Phase One: Celebrity Take Down in 2002. He chiefly writes all the interviews as the characters for magazines who wish to interview Noodle, 2D, Russel and Murdoc. He co-wrote and co-directed the 2001 mock-documentary "Charts of Darkness" on Gorillaz for Channel 4 in association with Dazed TV, and hosted by Krishnan Guru-Murthy. This was subsequently licensed to MTV and shown worldwide. Cass also wrote, voice-directed and was the musical supervisor for the Gorillaz episode of MTV Cribs, which featured Murdoc Niccals showing the viewers around the Gorillaz Kong Studio. The video aired on 26 December 2005.

With Gorillaz he worked on the campaigns and collaborations with 3 Mobile, Motorola, Microsoft and Converse. The collaboration with Converse was a part their "Three Artists. One Song" project, which commissioned the Gorillaz track DoYaThing featuring LCD Soundsystem frontman James Murphy and André 3000 of Outkast.

He is also featured in the film Bananaz, which documents the journey of the Gorillaz band from 2001 until 2005, playing in the studio and live.

From 2009 to 2019, Cass was a member of the reimagined Penguin Cafe, originally conceived by Arthur Jeffes, son of Simon Jeffes and Emily Young, as a continuation of his father's project the Penguin Cafe Orchestra. Penguin Cafe appeared at various festivals, theatre venues and Arts events and were frequent visitors to Japan.

In 2016 Cass joined east London band Deadcuts, which also features former Senseless Things frontman Mark Keds, but has since taken an extended leave from the group.

Alongside original Senseless Things member Morgan Nicholls, Delakota partner Des Murphy and guitarist Ade Emsley, Cass formed Circle 60, a "neuer Klang sonic-assemblage of psychedelic-punk, art and Sci-fi melodics". They released their debut album "Sawnoff ShotGold" in 2018.

In 2019 he formed alternative rock supergroup Loup GarouX, with Mercury-nominated songwriter Ed Harcourt and Richard Jones of The Feeling. The Loup GarouX track "Sleep Forever" was featured as the title and show music for the ITV2 zombie-apocalypse show "Zomboat!" The first official single 'I Know The Truth About You' received airplay from BBC Radio 1 and BBC 6 Music.

Loup GarouX made their first live appearance On 21 February 2020 at Glasgow’s Barrowland Ballroom as support to the recently reformed Supergrass on their UK Tour. This culminated in two nights at London’s Alexandra Palace venue, on 6 and 7 March.

Loup GarouX are to release their debut album “Strangerlands” - written, recorded and produced by the band at Harcourt’s Wolf Cabin studio - in October 2021. The album is mixed by Cenzo Townshend.

Selected discography

with Senseless Things
1989: Postcard C.V. (album)
1991: The First of Too Many (album)
1993: Empire of the Senseless (album)
1994: Peel Sessions (compilation)
1995: Taking Care of Business (album)
1998: The Singles (compilation)
2022: The First of Too Many - 30th Anniversary Edition (album)

with Delakota
1998: One Love (album)
2022: One Love - Deluxe Edition (album)

with Damon Albarn
2002: Mali Music (album)

with Gorillaz
2001: Gorillaz (album)
2005: Demon Days
2006: Demon Days: Live at the Manchester Opera House (Live album / DVD)

with Penguin Cafe
2009: Live At The Royal Albert Hall (album)
2011: A Matter of Life... (album)
2014: The Red Book (album)
2017: The Imperfect Sea (album)
2019: Handfuls of Night (album)

with Deadcuts
2018: Hit on All Sixxes (album)

with Circle60
2018: SawnOff ShotGold (album)

with Loup GarouX
2021: Strangerlands (album)

References

External links
 Official Gorillaz website
 Official Penguin Cafe website
 Senseless Things website
 Loup GarouX website

1971 births
Living people
English rock drummers
Writers from London
Musicians from London
21st-century drummers
Penguin Cafe members
Gorillaz members